These are the partial results of the athletics competition at the 1967 Mediterranean Games taking place between 13 and 16 September in Tunis, Tunisia. This edition marked the first time that women participated in the Games.

Men's results

100 meters
Heats – 13 September

Final – 15 September

200 meters
Heats – 15 SeptemberWind: Heat 1: +1.0 m/s, Heat 2: +0.1 m/s

Final – 16 September

400 meters
Heats – 14 September

Final – 15 September

800 meters
Heats – 13 September

Final – 14 September

1500 meters
15 September

5000 meters
16 September

10,000 meters
15 September

Marathon
16 September

110 meters hurdles
Heats – 13 September

Final – 15 September

400 meters hurdles
Heats – 13 September

Final – 15 September

3000 meters steeplechase
15 September

4 × 100 meters relay
14 September

4 × 400 meters relay
16 September

20 kilometers walk
13 September

50 kilometers walk
15 September

High jump
16 September

Pole vault
14 September

Long jump
14 September

Triple jump
16 September

Shot put
14 September

Discus throw
15 September

Javelin throw
16 September

Women's results

100 meters
16 September

80 meters hurdles
15 September

High jump

Long jump
15 September

Shot put

Javelin throw

References

Day 1 results
Day 2 results
Day 3 results
Day 4 results
Day 5 results

Mediterranean Games
1967